Śląsk Wrocław is a ladies football team based in Wrocław, Poland. The team plays in the Ekstraliga, the top division of women's football in Poland. The team is the women's football section of Ekstraklasa team Śląsk Wrocław.

History
In 2020 it was announced that Śląsk Wrocław and KŚ AZS Wrocław had reached an agreement, with Śląsk taking AZS's position in the Ekstraliga, therefor bypassing the need to work up from the lowest divisions. It was announced that the ladies football team would include youth teams in the clubs academy set up, and would incorporate many of the staff members and players of the KŚ AZS Wrocław team.

Honours

Puchar Polski
Runners-up (1): 2021–22

Seasons

Club statistics

League top goalscorers

References

External links 
 

Śląsk Wrocław
2020 establishments in Poland
Association football clubs established in 2020
Women's football clubs in Poland
Sport in Wrocław